Blessed is the eleventh album in the live praise and worship series of contemporary worship music by Hillsong Church. It was recorded live at the Sydney Entertainment Centre on 3 March 2002 by Darlene Zschech and the Hillsong Worship Team. Blessed saw Marty Sampson step up to lead worship alongside Darlene Zschech and Reuben Morgan for the night. Over 10,000 people from Hillsong Church attended the recording. The album reached No. 4 on the ARIA Albums Chart.

Track listing
 "Blessed" (Darlene Zschech, Reuben Morgan) – lead vocals: Darlene Zschech, Reuben Morgan 
 "Now That You're Near" (Marty Sampson) – lead vocals: Marty Sampson, b. Darlene Zschech 
 "Shout of the King" (Ned Davies) – lead vocals: Darlene Zschech 
 "Made Me Glad" (Miriam Webster) – lead vocals: Darlene Zschech 
 "Through It All" (Morgan) – lead vocals: Darlene Zschech, b. Reuben Morgan 
 "Son of God" (Lincoln Brewster and Marty Sampson) – lead vocals: Marty Sampson, b. Darlene Zschech 
 "One Desire" (Joel Houston) – lead vocals: Marty Sampson, Darlene Zschech
 "Magnificent" (Raymond Badham) – lead vocals: Tulele Faletolu 
 "I Adore" (Reuben Morgan) – lead vocals: Darlene Zschech, b. Reuben Morgan
 "All I Do" (Gio Galanti, Natasha Bedingfield) – lead vocals: Darlene Zschech
 "With You" (Reuben Morgan) – lead vocals: Darlene Zschech, b. Reuben Morgan
 "Most High" (Reuben Morgan) – lead vocals: Reuben Morgan, b. Darlene Zschech
 "King of Majesty" (Marty Sampson) – lead vocals: Tulele Faletolu, b. Darlene Zschech
 "All the Heavens" (Reuben Morgan) – lead vocals: Darlene Zschech

b. lead backing vocals

Personnel

 Brian and Bobbie Houston (senior pastors) – executive producers
 Darlene Zschech – producer, worship pastor, worship leader, senior lead vocals, vocal production, songwriter
 Reuben Morgan – lead vocals, acoustic guitar, songwriter
 Marty Sampson – lead vocals, acoustic guitar, songwriter
 Steve McPherson – vocals, vocal producer
 Miriam Webster – vocals, songwriter
 Damian Bassett – vocals
 Julie Bassett – vocals 
 Erica Crocker – vocals 
 Ned Davies – vocals 
 Kathryn de Araujo – vocals 
 Tulele Faletolu – vocals
 Lucy Fisher – vocals 
 Karen Horn – vocals 
 Scott Haslem – vocal production/vocals 
 Peter Hart – vocals 
 Garth Lazaro – vocals 
 Katrina Tadman
 Woody Pierson – vocals 
 David Moyse – electric guitar
 Peter King – piano, keyboards, Hammond organ
 Craig Gower – keyboards
 Kevin Lee – keyboards 
 Raymond Badham – acoustic and electric guitars, music director
 Nigel Hendroff – acoustic and electric guitars
 Marcus Beaumont – electric guitar
 Michael Guy Chislett – electric guitar 
 Ian Fisher – bass
 Joel Houston – bass  
 Mitch Farmer – drums  
 Luke Munns – drums 
 Jeff de Araujo – percussion 
 Peter Kelly – percussion 
 Sonja Bailey – percussion 
 Matthew Hope – trumpet 
 Steve Bullivant – saxophone 
 James Rudder – saxophone, violin
 Gary Honor – saxophone 
 Hillsong Church Choir – choir
 Martine Williams – choir conductor
 Ruth Athanasio – choir conductor
 Tanya Riches – choir conductor
 Andrew Sloan – choir conductor
 Josh Bonett – artwork liaison coordinator
 Carlie Carmona – artwork liaison coordinator

References 

2002 live albums
Hillsong Music live albums